The Metropolitan Police Federation is a staff association that represents the interests of all police in the Metropolitan Police Service up to the rank of Chief Inspector in England and Wales.  It seeks to ensure that the Metropolitan Police Service operates to the highest professional standards and that it is fully accountable.

The Metropolitan Police Federation is affiliated to the Police Federation of England and Wales.

External links
 Metropolitan Police Federation

Metropolitan Police
Legal organisations based in England and Wales